Antonio Rigamonti (born April 5, 1949) is a retired Italian professional football player.

Career
Born in Carate Brianza, Rigamonti began playing football with Atalanta. He made his Serie A debut against Internazionale on 3 October 1971. He played for 6 seasons (61 games, 3 goals) in the Serie A for Atalanta B.C., Calcio Como, A.C. Milan and U.S. Cremonese.

For most of his A.C. Milan career he was the backup to Enrico Albertosi, until Albertosi was disqualified in the Totonero 1980 betting scandal, and Rigamonti became the first-choice goalkeeper for the last 10 games with Milan.

In a rare case for a goalkeeper, he was a penalty-kick taker with Calcio Como, scoring 6 goals, including 3 in the Serie A.

Honours
 Serie A champion: 1978/79.
 Coppa Italia winner: 1976/77.

References

1949 births
Living people
People from Carate Brianza
Italian footballers
Serie A players
Atalanta B.C. players
U.S. Cremonese players
Como 1907 players
A.C. Milan players
S.S.D. Varese Calcio players
A.C.R. Messina players
S.S. Akragas Città dei Templi players
Association football goalkeepers
Footballers from Lombardy
Sportspeople from the Province of Monza e Brianza